Robert T. Gerlai is a Canadian behaviour geneticist.

Early life and education
Gerlai obtained his PhD in 1987 from the Eötvös Loránd University and the Hungarian Academy of Sciences in Budapest.

Career
Gerlai has worked in the biotechnology (Genentech) and biopharmaceutical research industries (Eli Lilly and Company and Saegis Pharmaceuticals) as Senior Scientist and Vice President of Research, and led pre-clinical as well as clinical research teams developing drugs to treat mild cognitive impairment and Alzheimer's Disease.  He also worked at different universities in North America and Europe. He is a Distinguished Professor of behavioral neuroscience at the Department of Psychology at the University of Toronto. 

The Web of Science lists over 300 peer-reviewed publications for Gerlai, which have been cited nearly 15000 times, resulting in an h-index of 62. Gerlai has worked with several different animal species, including paradise fish and mice. He was among the first to use transgenic mice in the analysis of learning and memory and showed that astrocytes play important roles in synaptic plasticity.  He is also known for discovering the role of Eph tyrosine kinases and their ephrin ligands in neuronal plasticity.  He is considered a leader of zebrafish behavioral neuroscience research, and has been using  this species, and studies the effects of alcohol on brain function and behaviour, including social behaviour, fear-anxiety, and learning and memory.

Honours 
Gerlai is an elected Fellow of the International Behavioral Neuroscience Society, of which he also has been president. He is a member of the editorial boards of Biology, Genes, Brain and Behavior,  Neurotoxicology and Teratology, Learning and Behavior,  Current Opinion in Behavioral Sciences, Zebrafish and F1000.  He is section editor for behavioral neuroscience of BMC Neuroscience.
In 2013, Gerlai received the Distinguished Scientist Award from the International Behavioural and Neural Genetics Society. In 2015, he received the Research Excellence Award from the University of Toronto. In 2019 he received the Outstanding Achievement Award from the International Behavioral Neuroscience Society and became the John Carlin Roder Distinguished Professor in Behavioural Neuroscience at the University of Toronto Mississauga.

References

External links 
 

Behavior geneticists
Living people
1960 births
Hungarian scientists
Canadian neuroscientists
Book editors